The following list includes notable people who were born or have lived in Evanston, Illinois. For a similar list organized alphabetically by last name, see the category page People from Evanston, Illinois.

Academia 

 Oliver Marcy, two-time president of Northwestern University.
 Dale T. Mortensen, Nobel Prize winner in economics, faculty of Northwestern University.
 Edmund Phelps, Nobel Prize winner in economics and professor. 
 Stuart Vyse, psychologist and author. Specialist on superstitions.
 John Carrier Weaver, American professor of geography, and college administrator for several major universities in the United States.
 John Henry Wigmore, dean of Northwestern Law School.

Business
* John C. Whitehead, banker, chairman of Goldman Sachs, U.S. Deputy Secretary of State 1985-89, board member of World Trade Center Memorial Foundation (WTC Memorial Foundation)
 William Liston Brown, director of American Ship Building Company
James Cayne, former CEO of Bear Stearns
 Lester Crown, son of Chicago financier Henry Crown and controls family holdings
 John Donahoe, president and CEO of eBay, born in Evanston
 Bob Galvin, former CEO of Motorola
 Hecky Powell, restaurateur
 Gordon Segal, founder and CEO of Crate & Barrel
 Gwynne Shotwell, American businesswoman, engineer, president and chief operating officer of SpaceX

Entertainment

 Kate Baldwin, actress and singer
 Viola Barry, silent film actress
 William Bassett, actor
 Carlos Bernard, actor
 Marlon Brando, actor
 Tamara Braun, actress
 Heather Burns, actress
 Ronnie Burns, actor
 Timothy Carhart, actor
 William Christopher, actor, charity spokesperson
 Joan Cusack, actress
 John Cusack, actor
 John Dickson, poet and short story writer
 Sean Evans, host of Hot Ones
 Robert Falls, director
 Julie Fulton, actress
 Dan Flannery, actor
 Zach Gilford, actor
 Alicia Goranson, actress
 Seth Gordon, director, producer, editor
Laura Harrier, actress
 Barbara Harris, actress
 Charlton Heston, actor
 Anders Holm, comedian and co-creator of Workaholics
 James Jewell, voice actor, producer & director for radio shows The Lone Ranger and The Green Hornet
 Jake Johnson, actor
 Amanda Jones, Miss Illinois USA 1973 & Miss USA 1973
 Tim Kazurinsky, actor and writer, Saturday Night Live
 Walter Kerr, drama critic
 Lauren Lapkus, actor and comedian
 Jeffrey Lieber, writer and co-creator of the television series Lost
 Richard Long, actor
 Michael Madsen, actor
 John Lee Mahin, Oscar-nominated screenwriter
 Jeff McCracken, actor, director, producer
 Elizabeth McGovern, Oscar-nominated actress
 Patrick Melton, screenwriter
 Josh Meyers, actor and comedian
 Seth Meyers, actor and comedian
 John Moffatt, producer
 Jessie Mueller, actress and singer
 Bill Murray, actor and comedian
 James Olson, actor
 Ajay Naidu, actor and singer
 D.A. Pennebaker, documentary filmmaker
 William Petersen, actor
 Steve Pink, director, screenwriter, and producer
 Jeremy Piven, actor
 Shira Piven, director
 David Schwimmer, actor
 Anna D. Shapiro, award-winning director
Jerry Springer
 Hope Summers, actress, founder of Evanston's Showcase Theater
 Daniel Sunjata, actor
 Dave VanDam, voice actor
 Ruby Wax, comedian
 Jenniffer Weigel, actress, writer
 Rafer Weigel, actor, television personality
 Martin Sherman, actor

Music 

 Steve Albini, music producer
 Fred Anderson, saxophonist
 Benjamin Bagby, singer, performer of medieval music
 Stuart D. Bogie, musician and arranger
 David Burge, pianist
 Kenneth C. Burns, Jethro of Homer and Jethro
 Kevin Cronin, of REO Speedwagon
 Patti Drew, 1960s soul singer
 Alexander Frey, conductor, pianist, organist, harpsichordist, composer and recording artist
 Ezra Furman, of Ezra Furman and the Harpoons
 Steve Goodman, songwriter and musician
 Greg Graffin
 Nancy Gustafson, opera singer
 David Ryan Harris, musician
 Stafford James, musician, composer
 Josh Kantor, organist
 Howard Levy, harmonica musician
 Junior Mance, jazz pianist and composer
 Jason Narducy, musician
 Michael Omartian, pianist, keyboard player and producer
 Julianne Phillips, model and actress
 Matthew Polenzani, opera singer
 Ryan Raddon, producer known as Kaskade
 Frank Rosenwein, classical oboist
 Natalie Sleeth, composer
 Grace Slick, of Jefferson Starship
 Patrick Stump, of Fall Out Boy
 Eddie Vedder, of Pearl Jam
 Loraine Wyman, early 20th century performer and fieldworker in folk song

Politics, government, and military 

 Lorraine H. Morton, mayor of Evanston, Illinois from 1993 to 2009; Evanston's Longest serving mayor, first democratic mayor and first African-American mayor
 W. Russell Arrington, Illinois state legislator and lawyer
 Alan E. Ashcraft Jr., Illinois state representative and judge
 George Wildman Ball, Undersecretary of State for Presidents Kennedy and Johnson
 James J. Barbour, Illinois lawyer and state legislator, practiced law in Evanston
 John Lourie Beveridge, 16th governor of Illinois
 Charles E. Browne, Wisconsin territorial legislator
 Marguerite S. Church, U.S. Representative 1951–1963
 Ralph E. Church, U.S. Representative 1935–1941, 1943–1950
 James M. Cole, U.S. Deputy Attorney General
 Burton C. Cook, U.S. Representative 1865–1871
 Charles Gates Dawes, Vice President of the United States, 1925–1929; Nobel Peace Prize winner, 1925
 Henry M. Dawes, U.S. Comptroller of the Currency 1923–1924
 Frances L. Dawson, Illinois state representative and educator<ref>'Illinois Blue Book 1969-1970, Biographical Sketch of Frances L. Dawson, pg. 10-191</ref>
 Thomas C. Foley, U.S. Ambassador to Ireland, 2010 Republican gubernatorial candidate in Connecticut
 Robert Gettleman, federal judge
 James William Good, U.S. Secretary of War 1929
 Nathaniel M. Gorton, federal judge
 Mary Jeanne Hallstrom, nurse and politician
 Julian J. Hook, Minnesota state legislator and lawyer
 Jim Kolbe, congressman
 Lynn Morley Martin, Secretary of Labor under President George H.W. Bush
 Catherine Waugh McCulloch, lawyer, suffragist, first woman to be elected Justice of the Peace in Illinois
 H.H.C. Miller, colonel to Illinois Governor Richard Yates, Jr., three-time mayor of Evanston
 John Porter, congressman
 Donald Rumsfeld, U.S. Secretary of Defense, congressman
 Andrew Shuman, Lieutenant Governor of Illinois 1877–1881
 Joseph A. Strohl, Wisconsin state senator
 Leroy D. Thoman, U.S. Civil Service Commissioner 1883–1885
 Julius White, American Civil War brigadier general

 Scientists 

 Isabella Garnett, pioneering African-American female physician and founder of Community Hospital
 J. Allen Hynek, astronomer, professor, and ufologist
 Peter Shirley, computer scientist and computer graphics researcher

Sports figures

 Mike Adamle, NFL running back and sports broadcaster
 Cornelia Wicker Armsby, golfer
 Bessie Anthony, golfer
 Elmer Bennett, ACB basketball player
 Dave Bergman, MLB player for the New York Yankees, Houston Astros, San Francisco Giants and Detroit Tigers
 Pete Burnside, MLB pitcher for the New York Giants, San Francisco Giants, Washington Senators, Detroit Tigers and Baltimore Orioles
 John Castino, MLB infielder for the Minnesota Twins
 Jack Cooley, basketball player for the University of Notre Dame
 Yu Darvish, baseball player for the Chicago Cubs
 Luke Donald, professional golfer
 Paddy Driscoll, Hall of Fame football player
 Lindsey Durlacher, wrestler
 Kevin Foster, MLB pitcher for the Chicago Cubs, Philadelphia Phillies, and Texas Rangers
 Pat Fitzgerald, head football coach for the Northwestern Wildcats
 Tim Floyd NBA and college basketball coach
 Clint Frank, college football halfback, 1937 Heisman Trophy winner
 Kevin Frederick, MLB pitcher for the Minnesota Twins and Toronto Blue Jays
 Timothy Goebel, Olympic figure skater
 Dov Grumet-Morris (born 1982), ice hockey player
 Robert Jeangerard, Olympic basketball gold medalist
 Damon Jones, NFL tight end
 Brandon Hyde, coach for the Chicago Cubs
 Mike Kenn, offensive tackle for the Atlanta Falcons, Pro Bowl selection
 Bob Lackey, Marquette and ABA basketball player
 Jim Lindeman, MLB player for the St. Louis Cardinals, Detroit Tigers, Philadelphia Phillies, Houston Astros and New York Mets
 Freddie Lindstrom, Hall of Fame baseball player
 Billy Martin, tennis player and coach
 Brian McBride, soccer player
 Bob Mionske, Olympic and professional bicycle racer
 Emery Moorehead, tight end for Super Bowl XX champion Chicago Bears
 Steve Parker, NFL player
 Wes Parker, MLB first baseman for the Los Angeles Dodgers
 Josh Paul, MLB catcher for the Chicago White Sox, Chicago Cubs, Los Angeles Angels of Anaheim and Tampa Bay Devil Rays
 Dan Peterson, basketball coach
 Mike Quade, baseball player, coach and manager of Chicago Cubs
 Dewey Robinson, MLB pitcher for the Chicago White Sox
 Mike Rogodzinski, MLB outfielder for the Philadelphia Phillies
 Clarke Rosenberg (born 1993), American-Israeli basketball player in the Israel Basketball Premier League
 Erik Spoelstra, head coach, Miami Heat
 Everette Stephens, player for the Indiana Pacers and Milwaukee Bucks
 Dick Strahs, MLB pitcher for the Chicago White Sox
 Peter Ueberroth, sixth commissioner of Major League Baseball, chairman of the United States Olympic Committee
 Ed Weiland, MLB pitcher for the Chicago White Sox
 Aaron Williams, NBA basketball player
 Tommy Wingels, NHL player for the Chicago Blackhawks

 Visual artists, designers 
 Jane Fulton Alt, photographer
 John Dilg, painter and educator
 Edie Fake, fine artist and comic/zine author
 Karen Finley, performance artist
 Margaret Burnham Geddes, architect
 Martha Nessler Hayden, painter
 Kysa Johnson, painter
 Albert Henry Krehbiel, art teacher; impressionist painter and muralist; married to Dulah Marie Evans; died in Evanston
 Allison Miller, abstract painter
 Eugene Montgomery, painter
 Jay Ryan, illustrator and screen-printer, working professionally as The Bird Machine, musician
 Robert Slimbach, typeface designer, author of Myriad, Adobe Garamond, Adobe Jenson, Utopia, Cronos
 Adrian Smith, architect of the tallest building in the world
Gahan Wilson, cartoonist for The New Yorker, Playboy.''
 Erik Winquist, visual effects supervisor, Best known for his work on films featuring computer generated effects: Peter Jackson's King Kong (2005), Avatar (2009), Dawn of the Planet of the Apes (2014), and War for the Planet of the Apes (2017).

Writers, playwrights, journalists 

 Mildred L. Batchelder, namesake of the ALA award given to the publisher of a translated children's book
 Beatrice Bruteau, American contemplative, philosopher and author
 Algis Budrys, science fiction author
 Allen G. Debus, historian of science and medicine, known primarily for his work on the history of chemistry and alchemy.
 Sarah Dessen, fiction author
 Carl Fick, author and film director
 James Foley, journalist, freelance war correspondent, and first American killed by the terrorist group, the Islamic State of Iraq and the Levant,
Jeffrey Gettleman, journalist
 Charles Gibson, news anchor
 Laurens Hammond, inventor of the Hammond organ 
 George W. Hotchkiss, 19th-century journalist, editor, historian, and lumber dealer
 Cassidy Hubbarth, sports anchor 
 Charles R. Johnson, author, National Book Award winner
 Clara Ingram Judson, children's book author
 Benay Lappe, publicist, professor, writer, female theologian, Covenant Award winner in education
 Mark McIntosh, priest and theologian
 Samuel Merwin, author and playwright
 Bob Mionske, attorney, author, former Olympic and professional bicycle racer
 Drew Pearson, newspaper columnist
 Richard Powers, author and National Book Award winner
 Alice Riley (1867–1955), author of children's media; founder of the Drama League of America and the Evanston Arts Center; lived in Evanston
 Albert Tangora, holder of world speed record for typing on a manual typewriter
 George Thiem, 1950 Pulitzer Prize-winning reporter
 Edward Thomson, writer and bishop of the Methodist Episcopal Church
 Henry Kitchell Webster, author and playwright
 Frances Willard, temperance advocate and suffragist
 Garry Wills, Pulitzer Prize-winning writer/critic

Other 

 Starr Faithfull, socialite known for her unsolved death

References

Evanston
Evanston